Gorm the Old, also called Gorm the Languid, was ruler of Denmark, reigning from  to his death  or a few years later. He ruled from Jelling, and made the oldest of the Jelling Stones in honour of his wife Thyra. Gorm was born before 900 and died perhaps around 958 or possibly 963 or 964.

Ancestry and reign 
Gorm is the reported son of semi-legendary Danish king Harthacnut. Chronicler Adam of Bremen says that Harthacnut came from Northmannia to Denmark and seized power in the early 10th century. He deposed the young king Sigtrygg Gnupasson, reigning over Western Denmark. When Harthacnut died, Gorm ascended the throne.

Heimskringla reports Gorm taking at least part of the kingdom by force from Gnupa, and Adam himself suggests that the kingdom had been divided prior to Gorm's time. Gorm is first mentioned as the host of Archbishop Unni of Hamburg and Bremen in 936. According to the Jelling Stones, Gorm's son, Harald Bluetooth, "won all of Denmark", so it is speculated that Gorm only ruled Jutland from his seat in Jelling.

Marriage to Thyra 
Gorm married Thyra, who is given conflicting and chronologically dubious parentage by late sources, but no contemporary indication of her parentage survives. Gorm raised one of the great burial mounds at Jelling as well as the oldest of the Jelling Stones for her, calling her tanmarkar but ("Denmark's Salvation" or "Denmark's Adornment"). Gorm was the father of three sons, Toke, Knut and Harald, later King Harald Bluetooth.

His wife, Thyra, is credited with the completion of the Danevirke, a wall between Denmark's southern border and its unfriendly Saxon neighbors to the south. The wall was not new, but it was expanded with a ditch and earthen foundation topped by a timber stockade above it. The Danevirke ran between the Schlei and the Treene river, across what is now Schleswig.

Death, burial and reburial 
One theory is that Gorm died in the winter of 958–959, this is based on dendrochronology that shows that the burial chamber in the northern burial mound in Jelling was made from wood felled in 958. Arild Huitfeldt relates one legend of his death in Danmarks Riges Krønike:

This account would contradict information on the Jelling Stones which point to Queen Thyra dying before Gorm. Some archaeologists and historians have suggested that Gorm was buried first in Queen Thyra's grave mound at Jelling, and later moved by his son, Harald Bluetooth, into the original wooden church in Jelling. According to this theory it is believed that the skeleton found at the site of the first Christian church of Jelling is in fact Gorm the Old, though the theory is still much debated. During the reign of Gorm, most Danes still worshipped the Norse gods, but during the reign of Gorm's son, Harald Bluetooth, Denmark officially converted to Christianity. Harald, accordingly, left the hill where Gorm had originally been interred as a memorial.

Legacy  
Gorm was "old" in the sense that he was considered the traditional ancestral "head" of the Danish monarchy.  Saxo Grammaticus in the Gesta Danorum asserts that Gorm was older than other monarchs and, having lived so long, was blind by the time his son Canute was killed.

See also 

 Gorm's Cup

References

Further reading 
 Birkebæk, Frank (2003). Vikingetiden i Danmark. Viborg: Sesam. 
 Hybel, Nils (2003). Danmark i Europa: 750–1300. København: Museum Tusculanums forlag. 
 Johannessen, Kåre (2001). Politikens bog om Danmarks vikingetid. Politikens håndbøger. København: Politikens forlag. 
 Lund, Niels (2020). Jellingkongerne og deres forgængere, Gylling: Vikingeskibsmuseet i Roskilde. 
 Sawyer, P. H. (1999). The Oxford Illustrated History of the Vikings. Oxford: Oxford University Press. 
 Thiedecke, Arendse, and Thiedecke, Johnny (2003). De danske vikinger: samfund, kongemagt og togter ca. 700–1050. Valby: Pantheon. 

10th-century kings of Denmark
House of Knýtlinga
People from Vejle Municipality
9th-century births
Year of birth unknown
950s deaths
Year of death uncertain

Burials in Denmark